The 2017–18 Mladost Lučani season is the football club's 4th straight season in Serbian SuperLiga.

Squad

Transfers

Summer

In:

Out:

References

External links
 Official website

FK Mladost Lučani seasons
Mladost Lučani